NGC 2782 is a peculiar spiral galaxy that formed after a galaxy merger in the constellation Lynx. The galaxy lies 75 million light years away from Earth, which means, given its apparent dimensions, that NGC 2782 is approximately 100,000 light years across. NGC 2782 has an active galactic nucleus and it is a starburst and a type 1 Seyfert galaxy. NGC 2782 is mentioned in the Atlas of Peculiar Galaxies in the category galaxies with adjacent loops.

Structure

Active galactic nucleus 
The nucleus and circumnuclear region of NGC 2782 display starburst activity, with bar of the galaxy providing gas to the nucleus. The active galactic nucleus is hidden by a compact high-column-density absorber and a H2O maser is associated with it. The vigorous star formation creates an unusual "superwind" of out-flowing gas, which has been detected in X-rays as a bubble like structure, approximately 7 arcsec south of the central region of the galaxy. A similar bubble can be seen in radiowaves at the north side. There is also diffuse X-rays emission. The nucleus of NGC 2782 is a low luminosity active galactic nucleus.

Tidal tails 
NGC 2782 shows two tidal tails, extending in opposite directions. A shorter HI plume extending toward the east has been associated with the stellar tail which extends 2.7 arcmin toward the east in the optical images. The northwest tail is fainter in the optical spectrum. There is star formation activity in the eastern tail. In the western tail, 7 UV sources have been detected. These stellar populations are 1 to 11 million years old. Three of them have high metallicity, similar to that of the nucleus of the galaxy.

Ultraluminous X-ray sources 
Via observations by the Chandra X-ray Observatory, 27 X-ray point sources, of which 13 are ultraluminous X-ray sources (without counting the central one), were observed near the nucleus and are likely associated with the galaxy. This number is unusually high for a galaxy, although ultraluminous X-ray sources are common in starburst galaxies. Sixteen of these sources have a visual counterpart.

Nearby galaxies 
NGC 2782 is the largest galaxy in a small group of four galaxies. Nearby galaxies include UGC 4867 and UGC 4871 and further away lie NGC 2785 and UGC 4889.

References

External links 

Spiral galaxies
Interacting galaxies
Starburst galaxies
Seyfert galaxies
Lynx (constellation)
2782
04852
215
26034